Toledo terror plot may refer to:

 2006 Toledo terror plot
 Toledo synagogue attack plot in 2018